Psammopolia is a genus of moths of the family Noctuidae.

Species
 Psammopolia arietis (Grote, 1879)
 Psammopolia insolens (Grote, 1874)
 Psammopolia ochracea (Smith, 1892)
 Psammopolia sala (Troubridge & Mustelin, 2006)
 Psammopolia wyatti (Barnes & Benjamin, 1926)

References
A Revision of Lasionycta Aurivillius (Lepidoptera, Noctuidae) for North America and notes on Eurasian species, with descriptions of 17 new species, 6 new subspecies, a new genus, and two new species of Tricholita Grote

Hadeninae